George McCurn (born January 21, 1920 – April 1985) was an American bass singer who started off singing gospel and switched to pop in the 1960s. He had a hit in 1963 with "I'm Just a Country Boy".

Career

Group
In 1948, he joined the vocal quartet Kings of Harmony, replacing their bass singer Isaac "Dickie" Freeman. In the early days he was also a member for a brief period of West Coast-based group the Gospel Harps. In 1950, he joined Fairfield Four and replaced Isaac Freeman who had previously replaced in Kings of Harmony. In October 1950, he recorded with the group and this marks the period of his first time recording. In 1954, he joined the Pilgrim Travellers, replacing their original bass singer, Rafael Taylor.
At one stage when he was in the Pilgrim Travellers, the other members at the time were Jesse Whittaker, Ernest Booker, Louis Rawls, and J.W. Alexander.

Solo
1960s
In early 1963, he had his I'm Just a Country Boy single released on A&M Records. It was listed in the February 23 issue of Billboard as a regional breakout single which though at that time, not on the Billboard Hot 100, but selling strongly.  By April 6, the single had climbed from 64 in the Hot 100 to 56.

His album Country Boy Goes to Town was a special merit pick in the June 1 edition of Billboard. It was reported in the June 29 edition of Billboard, following Festival Records exec director Frederick C. Marks signing a 5-year deal with A&M, the album was going to be rush released in Australia.

In March 1964, the single "Guess Who" which was written by JoAnn Belvin was released. It was backed with "One More Time For The Poor Man", which was written by Sonny Knight and Thora Johnson. "Guess  Who" also appeared on the Vault Records label with the cat no V.R. 002. The other side "At The Of A Rainbow" had the cat no V.R. 001., which indicates that it was probably the B side.

In 1966, the single "Too Many Tears" bw ": You Say You Don't Want Me" was released on Reprise.

1970s

In later years McCurn did some recording session work as a backing vocalist. Along with  Delia Gartnell, Gwenn Roberts, and Herman Hitson, he was one of the backing vocalist on the Truth album by King Hannibal, released in 1973. He was also one of the backing vocalists on Ry Cooder's Paradise and Lunch album which was released on Reprise Records in 1974.

In 1976, "Satchmo" bw "Old LA" was released on the Star-Brite label.

Personal life
McCurn died in Los Angeles in 1985, aged 65.

Discography

References

External links
 45cat: George McCurn - Discography
 Wilde World: George McCurn

1920 births
1985 deaths
Singers from Chicago
American gospel singers
American soul singers
A&M Records artists
20th-century African-American male singers